This is a list of the National Register of Historic Places listings in Sabine County, Texas.

This is intended to be a complete list of properties listed on the National Register of Historic Places in Sabine County, Texas. There are three properties listed on the National Register in the county.

Current listings

The publicly disclosed locations of National Register properties may be seen in a mapping service provided.

|}

Former listings

|}

See also

National Register of Historic Places listings in Texas
Recorded Texas Historic Landmarks in Sabine County

References

External links

Sabine County, Texas
Sabine County
Buildings and structures in Sabine County, Texas